Minas is a municipality and town in the Camagüey Province of Cuba.

Geography
The municipality borders with Sierra de Cubitas, Camagüey, Sibanicú, Guáimaro and Nuevitas. Its territory includes the villages of Anguila, Fomento, Gurugú, Las Piedras, Lugareño, Monte Oscuro, Redención and Senado.

Demographics
In 2004, the municipality of Minas had a population of 38,517.

See also
Minas Municipal Museum
List of cities in Cuba
Municipalities of Cuba

References

External links

Populated places in Camagüey Province